Mount Pleasant Township is an inactive township in Lawrence County, in the U.S. state of Missouri.

Mount Pleasant Township took its name from the extinct town of Mount Pleasant.

References

Townships in Missouri
Townships in Lawrence County, Missouri